Estelle Adiana (born ) is a Cameroonian female volleyball player. She is a member of the Cameroon women's national volleyball team and played for NYONG EKELLE in 2018. 

She was part of the Cameroonian national team at the 2017 Montreux Volley Masters, 2018 Montreux Volley Masters, 2017 FIVB Volleyball World Grand Prix, and 2018 FIVB Volleyball Women's World Championship.

Clubs 

  INJS Yaoundé (2018)

References

External links 

 http://www.fivb.org/viewPressRelease.asp?No=79164&Language=en#.W7uqDGhKjIU
 http://japan2018.fivb.com/en/competition/teams/cmr-cameroon/players/estelle-adiana?id=68811

1997 births
Living people
Cameroonian women's volleyball players
Place of birth missing (living people)
Opposite hitters
21st-century Cameroonian women